Mooresville Historic District is a national historic district located in Mooresville, Iredell County, North Carolina.  It encompasses 62 contributing buildings and 8 contributing sites in the central business district and surrounding residential sections of Mooresville.  The district includes notable examples of Italianate, Romanesque Revival, and Renaissance Revival architecture. Notable buildings include the Mooresville depot (c. 1920), the former Lorene Cotton Seed Oil Mill, First Presbyterian Church (1899), McLelland House, D. E. Turner Hardware Co. store, the former U. S. Post Office, and the McKnight Pontiac-Buick Co. (c. 1930).

It was listed on the National Register of Historic Places in 1980, with an enlargement approved in 2020.

Gallery

References

External links
 Mooresville Historic Preservation Commission

Historic districts on the National Register of Historic Places in North Carolina
Italianate architecture in North Carolina
Romanesque Revival architecture in North Carolina
Renaissance Revival architecture in North Carolina
Geography of Iredell County, North Carolina
National Register of Historic Places in Iredell County, North Carolina